Wisconsin Brewing Company Park is a baseball stadium in Oconomowoc, Wisconsin, part of the Milwaukee metropolitan area. Built in 2021, the ballpark is home to the Lake Country DockHounds, an independent professional baseball team in the American Association of Professional Baseball. The stadium was designed to fit soccer or lacrosse fields, and has an all artificial turf field so it can be used from when the snow melts to when the snow falls. The stadium is one part of the larger Lake Country Live development that also includes an attached indoor training facility.

History 
Diamond Club Entertainment, LLC, investors began searching for a Waukesha County baseball stadium site back in 2018. The first site was in the city of Pewaukee. Originally called Lake Country Commons the proposal included a public market and two multi-family housing units in addition to the stadium. With opposition mounting the focus shifted to a farm along I-94 in Summit. This proposal included an indoor sports training facility along with the stadium. The focus shifted down the road to the Pabst Farms development in Oconomowoc. On March 3, 2020, the Oconomowoc common counsel approved the building of the stadium and attached training facility. Just weeks later Governor Tony Evers signed his safer at home order, putting a hold on the construction. 

Ground was broken for the stadium on June 29, 2021. The DockHounds partnered with the Wisconsin Brewing Company, a craft brewing company based in Verona, Wisconsin, in a naming rights deal. The stadium will be called Wisconsin Brewing Company Park. The stadium includes a 5 barrel brewery, operated by Wisconsin Brewing Company, where the company will use the stadium to test new products before ramping up production at the main brewery in Verona.  The park opened on May 20, 2022, to a sold-out crowd of 3,999 fans.

References

External links 
 

Baseball venues in Wisconsin
Minor league baseball venues
Waukesha County, Wisconsin
Buildings and structures in Waukesha County, Wisconsin